Chad Tyler Lindberg (born November 1, 1976) is an American actor. He is known for his film roles in The Fast and the Furious and October Sky, as well as television roles on Sons of Anarchy and Supernatural. Lindberg was also the co-host of the television series Ghost Stalkers.

Life and career
Lindberg was born in Puyallup, Washington, the son of Luwana and Pete Lindberg. He attended Mount Vernon High School. He began his acting career as Rory in Black Circle Boys at the 1997 Sundance Film Festival. From there, he made several guest appearances on popular television shows, such as ER, Buffy the Vampire Slayer, and The X-Files. He continued pursuing films roles, particularly as Sherman O'Dell in October Sky and Jesse, a mechanic suffering from ADHD, in The Fast and the Furious.

He received attention for his role in I Spit on Your Grave, the 2010 remake of the '70s cult classic. He has also appeared in the recurring role of Chad Willingham on CSI: NY and as Ash on Supernatural. He took part in Tony Zierra's 2011 documentary My Big Break, which follows the early careers of Lindberg, Wes Bentley, Brad Rowe and Greg Fawcett. He was also a guest star in an episode of The Cape as Hicks, a professional sniper assassin. He was more recently featured as a paranormal investigator on the Destination America program Ghost Stalkers.

Filmography

References

External links

1976 births
Male actors from Washington (state)
American male film actors
American male television actors
Living people
People from Mount Vernon, Washington
20th-century American male actors
21st-century American male actors